Area code 913 is the telephone area code in the North American Numbering Plan (NANP) for northeastern Kansas. The numbering plan area (NPA) consists of a small ribbon of eight counties bordering Missouri—an area largely coextensive with the Kansas portion of the Kansas City Metropolitan Area.

Prior to July 20, 1997, numbering plan area 913 comprised all of northern Kansas from the Colorado state line to the Missouri state line, running along the entire border with Nebraska.

History
Despite a small population of less than two million, Kansas was divided lengthwise into two numbering plan areas during the establishment of the first formulation of the North American Numbering Plan by AT&T in 1947. The southern half of the state, including the largest city of the state, Wichita, as well as Dodge City, Emporia, and Garden City, received area code 316. The northern half, with its major population center around Kansas City along the Missouri state line, also including Shawnee, Overland Park, Lawrence, Manhattan, and Topeka, became numbering plan area 913.

The north-south split divided the population more evenly, and avoided cutting the major toll traffic routes that ran in east-west directions, a rule of traffic and implementation cost analysis.  The dividing line ran from west to east roughly following a path along Kansas Routes 4 and 96 from the Colorado state line eastward. It dipped along Interstate 135 in McPherson County and continued east to just north of Emporia in Lyon County, and then all the way to the Missouri state line.

Kansas City's growth necessitates a new code
The configuration of two area codes for Kansas remained unchanged for more than forty years. By the mid-1990s, the proliferation of cell phones, the growing population in the Kansas City metropolitan area (most notably Johnson County and Overland Park, as well as deregulation mandated by the Telecommunications Act of 1996, the pool for exchange codes in area code 913 were quickly being exhausted.

Late in 1996, the Kansas Corporation Commission, which oversees telecommunications in the state, requested relief from the North American Numbering Plan Administrator (NANPA) for the exchanges of area code 913, and on February 12, 1997, the NANPA approved a split of the 913 territory. The area from Lawrence westward received the new area code 785, while 913 was reduced to the Kansas City area. 785 began its split on July 20, 1997 and permissive dialing of 913 continued across northern Kansas until October 2, 1998.

Even with the Kansas City area's continued growth, 913 is nowhere near exhaustion. NANPA projections of 2017 estimate that the Kansas side of the Kansas City area will not need another area code until 2045.

Service area

Major cities

 Kansas City
 Louisburg
 Olathe
 Overland Park
 Shawnee
 Paola
Lenexa
Bonner Springs
De Soto

Major cities reassigned from NPA 913 to 785

 Colby
 Goodland
 Hays
 Junction City
 Lawrence
 Manhattan
 Salina
 Topeka

Boundaries
When the 785 split of numbering plan area 913 to removed most of the territory, Wyandotte, Linn, Miami, Johnson,  Leavenworth, and Atchison counties kept 913.  The city of Elwood, surrounded on three sides by Missouri, retained 913, despite the rest of Doniphan County switching to area code 785. This is because Elwood receives its dialtone from St. Joseph, Missouri, which is part of area code 816, the area code for the Missouri side of the Kansas City area. It would have been too expensive for Southwestern Bell to reroute Elwood's trunk line so it could follow the rest of Doniphan County into 785.

See also
List of NANP area codes

References

External links

 List of exchanges from AreaCodeDownload.com, 913 Area Code

913
913
Telecommunications-related introductions in 1947